General Reed may refer to:

Hamilton Reed (1869–1931), British Army major general
James Reed (soldier) (c. 1724–1807), Continental Army brigadier general 
Joseph Reed (politician) (1741–1785), Adjutant-General of the Continental Army
Randall Reed (fl. 1980s–2020s), U.S. Air Force major general
Robert H. Reed (1929–2017), U.S. Air Force general
Thomas Reed (British Army officer) (1796–1883), British Army general
Walter D. Reed (1924–2022), U.S. Air Force major general
Walter L. Reed (1877–1956), U.S. Army major general

See also
Attorney General Reed (disambiguation)
General Read (disambiguation)
General Reid (disambiguation)